{{DISPLAYTITLE:C19H24N2OS}}
The molecular formula C19H24N2OS (molar mass: 328.47 g/mol, exact mass: 328.1609 u) may refer to:

 Levomepromazine, also known as methotrimeprazine

Molecular formulas